The 2010 AFF Championship, sponsored by Suzuki and P&G and officially known as the 2010 AFF Suzuki Cup, was the 8th edition of the AFF Championship, took place on 1–29 December 2010. Indonesia and Vietnam hosted the group stage from 1 to 8 December. Two-legged home-and-away semi-finals and finals were held between 15 and 29 December 2010.

Vietnam were the defending champions, but were eliminated by Malaysia in the semi-finals. Indonesia appeared in their fourth final while the Philippines qualified for the semi-finals for the first time under the management of Simon McMenemy. Malaysia subsequently won their first ever title since they first appeared in the final in the inaugural edition, beating Indonesia 4–2 on aggregate in the finals. Malaysia became the first nation to win the AFF Cup (including tournaments held under earlier formats), despite losing two games in the tournament (both to Indonesia).

Hosts 
On 17 February 2009, Vietnam declared their interest in hosting the group stage. On 21 April 2009, the Vietnamese newspaper VietNamNet announced that Vietnam would co-host the group stage along with Indonesia.

Venues 
There were two main venues; the Gelora Bung Karno Stadium in Jakarta and the My Dinh National Stadium in Hanoi with two secondary venues which will be used simultaneously with the main venue on the final match day of the group stage. Originally, the secondary venue for Group B was the Hàng Đẫy Stadium in Hanoi. However, on 22 November 2010, the Vietnam Football Federation (VFF) announced that it would not be ready in time for the tournament due to ongoing renovations and was replaced by the Thiên Trường Stadium. For Group A, the original secondary venue was the Si Jalak Harupat Stadium in Bandung but on 24 November 2010 a week after an AFF meeting, it was announced that it would be replaced with the Gelora Sriwijaya Stadium. Teams qualifying for the semi-finals would also host a game, in this case, Malaysia whom qualified used their Bukit Jalil National Stadium for the semi final and final.

Qualification 

Qualification took place from 22 to 26 October 2010 in Laos, with the four lower-ranked teams (Laos, Cambodia, the Philippines and Timor-Leste) battling for two spots to the finals. However, the qualification tournament was held without Brunei due to FIFA's continued suspension of the Football Federation of Brunei Darussalam.

Six teams qualified for the finals, based on tournament records:
 
 
 
 
 
 

Two teams qualified via the qualification tournament:
  (Qualification winners)
  (Qualification runners-up)

Qualified teams 
The following eight teams qualified for the tournament.

Squads

Final tournament

Group stage

Group A 

 All matches were played in Indonesia.
 Times listed are UTC+7.

Group B 

 All matches were played in Vietnam.
 Times listed are UTC+7

Knockout stage

Semi-finals 
First Leg

Second Leg

Malaysia won 2–0 on aggregate.

Indonesia won 2–0 on aggregate.

† The first leg of the semi-finals was supposed to be played in the Philippines. However, due to the unavailability of a stadium that passes AFF standards, both legs were hosted by Indonesia.

Final 

First Leg

Second Leg

Malaysia won 4–2 on aggregate.

Awards

Goalscorers 
5 goals
  Safee Sali

3 goals
  Cristian Gonzáles
  Muhammad Ridwan

2 goals

  Arif Suyono
  Bambang Pamungkas
  Firman Utina
  Irfan Bachdim
  Mohd Amri Yahyah
  Norshahrul Idlan Talaha
  Christopher Greatwich
  Aleksandar Đurić
  Sarayuth Chaikamdee
  Nguyễn Anh Đức
  Nguyễn Trọng Hoàng
  Nguyễn Vũ Phong

1 goal

  Mohammad Nasuha
  Oktovianus Maniani
  Kanlaya Sysomvang
  Konekham Inthammvong
  Lamnao Singto
  Mohd Amirul Hadi Zainal
  Mahali Jasuli
  Mohd Ashaari Shamsuddin
  Aung Kyaw Moe
  Khin Maung Lwin
  Phil Younghusband
  Agu Casmir
  Suree Sukha
  Lê Tấn Tài
  Nguyễn Minh Phương

Own goals
  Asraruddin Putra Omar (playing against Indonesia)

Team statistics 
This table shows all team performance.

Media coverage

Incidents 

During the group match between Indonesia and Malaysia at the Gelora Bung Karno Stadium, some Indonesian fans are seen pointing green laser lights towards Malaysian goalkeeper Mohd Sharbinee when Indonesia scored their fifth goal as seen here. Other incidents also occurred soon after Malaysia's semi-final home leg against Vietnam, when Vietnamese goalkeeper Bùi Tấn Trường stated that he was targeted with green laser pointers from the Malaysian fans when he prepared for goal kicks and when saving the ball, which caused him to turn his head away. During the final, Malaysia's fans again targeted the opposition players with green laser pointers. The first leg, also at the Bukit Jalil National Stadium, was stopped for eight minutes starting in the 53rd minute when the Indonesian players walked off in protest and complained to referee Masaaki Toma about the laser lights. Malaysia scored their first goal right after play was resumed. The return-leg final in Jakarta saw Indonesian fans also pointing green laser lights again towards Malaysian goalkeeper Khairul Fahmi Che Mat.

References

External links 
 AFF Suzuki Cup official website
 ASEAN Football Federation official website

 
AFF Championship tournaments
1
2010
2010
2010–11 in Indonesian football
2010 in Vietnamese football
2010 in Burmese football
2010 in Laotian football
2010 in Thai football
2010 in Singaporean football
2010 in Philippine football
2010 in Malaysian football